Hydaticus is a genus of predatory water beetle belonging to the family Dytiscidae. Hydaticus can be found throughout most of the world. There are 150 described species and 12 subspecies in two subgenera in the genus Hydaticus.

Subgenus Hydaticus
These seven species are in the subgenus Hydaticus:
 Hydaticus aruspex Clark, 1864
 Hydaticus cinctipennis Aubé, 1838
 Hydaticus continentalis J. Balfour-Brown, 1944
 Hydaticus piceus LeConte, 1863
 Hydaticus schelkovnikovi Zaitzev, 1913
 Hydaticus seminiger (De Geer, 1774)
 Hydaticus transversalis (Pontoppidan, 1763)

Subgenus Prodaticus
These 143 species are in the subgenus Prodaticus:

 Hydaticus abyssinicus Régimbart, 1905
 Hydaticus aequabilis Guignot, 1958
 Hydaticus aequalis Benetti, Gustafson, Hamada & Short, 2020
 Hydaticus africanus (Rocchi, 1976)
 Hydaticus agaboides Sharp, 1882
 Hydaticus amydrus Guignot, 1955
 Hydaticus apiatus Guignot, 1947
 Hydaticus arcuatus Régimbart, 1895
 Hydaticus balkei Wewalka, 2015
 Hydaticus basicollis Régimbart, 1905
 Hydaticus batchianensis Sharp, 1882
 Hydaticus bengalensis Régimbart, 1899
 Hydaticus bihamatus Aubé, 1838
 Hydaticus bimarginatus (Say, 1830)
 Hydaticus bipunctatus Wehncke, 1876
 Hydaticus bitalensis Guignot, 1952
 Hydaticus bivittatus Laporte, 1835
 Hydaticus bowringii Clark, 1864
 Hydaticus caffer Boheman, 1848
 Hydaticus capicola Aubé, 1838
 Hydaticus chrisi Nilsson, 2001
 Hydaticus collarti Guignot, 1848
 Hydaticus concolor Sharp, 1882
 Hydaticus congo Gschwendtner, 1938
 Hydaticus conjungens Régimbart, 1899
 Hydaticus consanguineus Aubé, 1838
 Hydaticus daemeli Wehncke, 1876
 Hydaticus decorus Klug, 1834
 Hydaticus devexus Trémouilles, 1996
 Hydaticus dhofarensis Pederzani, 2003
 Hydaticus dineutoides Sharp, 1882
 Hydaticus dintelmanni Balke, Hendrich, Sagata & Wewalka, 2005
 Hydaticus discindens Walker, 1858
 Hydaticus dorsiger Aubé, 1838
 Hydaticus dregei Aubé, 1838
 Hydaticus ephippiiger Régimbart, 1899
 Hydaticus epipleuricus Régimbart, 1891
 Hydaticus exclamationis Aubé, 1838
 Hydaticus fabricii (W.S. Macleay, 1825)
 Hydaticus figuratus Régimbart, 1899
 Hydaticus fijiensis Régimbart, 1899
 Hydaticus flavolineatus Boheman, 1848
 Hydaticus fractifer Walker, 1858
 Hydaticus fractivittis Guignot, 1951
 Hydaticus fulvoguttatus Guignot, 1951
 Hydaticus fulvosparsus Gschwendtner, 1938
 Hydaticus galla Guérin-Méneville, 1847
 Hydaticus grammicus (Germar, 1827)
 Hydaticus guignoti Gschwendtner, 1938
 Hydaticus hajeki Wewalka, 2015
 Hydaticus hauthi Hendrich & Balke, 2020
 Hydaticus hendrichi Wewalka, 2015
 Hydaticus histrio Clark, 1864
 Hydaticus humeralis Régimbart, 1895
 Hydaticus incertus Régimbart, 1888
 Hydaticus ineptus Guignot, 1953
 Hydaticus inexspectatus Trémouilles, 1996
 Hydaticus intermedius Régimbart, 1895
 Hydaticus interrogator Mouchamps, 1957
 Hydaticus jaechi Wewalka, 2016
 Hydaticus jaenneli Guignot, 1936
 Hydaticus kolbei Branden, 1885
 Hydaticus kourouensis Hendrich & Balke, 2020
 Hydaticus laceratus Régimbart, 1895
 Hydaticus laetabilis Régimbart, 1899
 Hydaticus laosensis Wewalka, 2016
 Hydaticus larsoni Wewalka, 2015
 Hydaticus lateralis Laporte, 1835
 Hydaticus latior Régimbart, 1895
 Hydaticus lativittis Régimbart, 1895
 Hydaticus leander (Rossi, 1790)
 Hydaticus lepemangoyei Bilardo & Rocchi, 2018
 Hydaticus limnetes Guignot, 1955
 Hydaticus litigiosus Régimbart, 1880
 Hydaticus luczonicus Aubé, 1838
 Hydaticus macularis Régimbart, 1899
 Hydaticus madagascariensis Aubé, 1838
 Hydaticus major Régimbart, 1899
 Hydaticus manueli Wewalka & Jäch, 2018
 Hydaticus marlenae Wewalka, 2015
 Hydaticus matruelis Clark, 1864
 Hydaticus mexaformis Wewalka, 1979
 Hydaticus microdaemeli Watts, 1978
 Hydaticus mocquerysi Régimbart, 1895
 Hydaticus musivus Guignot, 1952
 Hydaticus natalensis Guignot, 1951
 Hydaticus nigritulus Régimbart, 1899
 Hydaticus nigrotaeniatus Régimbart, 1895
 Hydaticus okalehubyi Balke & Hendrich, 1992
 Hydaticus opaculus Gschwendtner, 1933
 Hydaticus ornatus H.J. Kolbe, 1883
 Hydaticus pacificus Aubé, 1838
 Hydaticus paganus Clark, 1864
 Hydaticus palliatus Aubé, 1838
 Hydaticus panguana Megna, Balke, Apenborn & Hendrich, 2019
 Hydaticus parallelus Clark, 1864
 Hydaticus pauli Wewaulka, 2016
 Hydaticus peregrinus Guignot, 1948
 Hydaticus pescheti Gschwendtner, 1930
 Hydaticus petitii Aubé, 1838
 Hydaticus philippensis Wehncke, 1876
 Hydaticus pictus (Sharp, 1882)
 Hydaticus plagiatus Régimbart, 1895
 Hydaticus platamboides Régimbart, 1895
 Hydaticus platteeuwi Severin, 1890
 Hydaticus poecilus Régimbart, 1895
 Hydaticus ponticus Sharp, 1882
 Hydaticus pulcher (Clark, 1863)
 Hydaticus pullatus Guignot, 1952
 Hydaticus quadriguttatus Régimbart, 1895
 Hydaticus quadrivittatus Blanchard, 1843
 Hydaticus rhantaticoides Régimbart, 1892
 Hydaticus rhantoides Sharp, 1882
 Hydaticus ricinus Wewalka, 1979
 ?Hydaticus riehli Wehncke, 1876
 Hydaticus rimosus Aubé, 1838
 Hydaticus rivanolis Wewalka, 1979
 ?Hydaticus rochei Camerano, 1907
 Hydaticus saecularis Pederzani, 1982
 Hydaticus scapularis Guignot, 1952
 Hydaticus sellatus Régimbart, 1883
 Hydaticus septemlineatus Zimmermann, 1928
 Hydaticus servillianus Aubé, 1838
 Hydaticus severini Régimbart, 1895
 Hydaticus sexguttatus Régimbart, 1899
 Hydaticus sobrinus Aubé, 1838
 Hydaticus speciosus Régimbart, 1895
 Hydaticus stappersi Peschet, 1915
 Hydaticus stastnyi Wewalka, 2015
 Hydaticus subfasciatus Laporte, 1835
 ?Hydaticus subsignatus Harold, 1879
 Hydaticus suffusus Régimbart, 1892
 Hydaticus tenuis Gschwendtner, 1938
 Hydaticus testudinarius Régimbart, 1895
 Hydaticus thermonectoides Sharp, 1884
 Hydaticus tibetanus Shaverdo, Wewalka & Li, 2012
 Hydaticus torosus Guignot, 1947
 Hydaticus tschoffeni Régimbart, 1895
 Hydaticus tuyuensis Trémouilles, 1996
 Hydaticus ugandaensis Guignot, 1936
 Hydaticus ussherii Clark, 1864
 Hydaticus vaziranii Wewalka, 1979
 ?Hydaticus verecundus Clark, 1864
 Hydaticus vittatus (Fabricius, 1775)
 Hydaticus vitticollis Régimbart, 1895
 Hydaticus xanthomelas (Brullé, 1837)
 Hydaticus zetteli Wewalka, 2016

References

External links

Hydaticus at Fauna Europaea

Dytiscidae